La Pyramide is a high-rise building located in the Plateau area of Abidjan, the largest city in Ivory Coast. Construction of the building began in 1968 and was completed in 1973. It was designed by Italian architect Rinaldo Olivieri who aimed to capture the activity of an African market in an urban setting.

It is one of the most famous buildings in Abidjan for its distinctive architecture and one of the first high-rise buildings built in the Plateau area at the time of the Ivorian miracle. Expats and other Ivorian elite from Abidjan resided in the body of the pyramid, while the ground floor was reserved for shops and boutiques. It deteriorated significantly in the 1990s, however, when it was deserted at the onset of political troubles. It is still waiting for renovation. With its inefficient ratio of rentable space to circulation, the building deteriorated considerably from the 1990s and became dangerous during the 2000s.

A program for complete renovation of La Pyramide was announced by the Ivorian government in 2011, through an offer of public-private partnership. The cost of the renovation is expected to be around 18 billion CFA francs and aims to make the Pyramide a tourist attraction.

References

Buildings and structures in Abidjan
1973 establishments in Ivory Coast
Office buildings completed in 1973